The Democratic Socialist Unionist Party ( - al-Hizb al-waHdawi al-ishtiraki ad-dimuqraTi) is a political party in Syria. It was formed as a breakaway from the Socialist Unionist Party in 1974. It joined the National Progressive Front (al-Jabha al-Wataniyya al-Taqaddumiyya) of legally licensed parties which support the socialist and Arab nationalist orientation of the government and accept the leadership of the Ba'ath Party at the end of December, 1988. The Democratic Socialist Unionist Party was led by Secretary General Ahmad al-Asa'ad from its founding until al-Asa'ad's death on March 9, 2001. Al-Asa'ad was a member of the Political Bureau of the Socialist Unionist Party until 1974, when he was pushed out by Socialist Unionist Secretary General Faiz Ismail.

After al-Asa'ad's death in 2001, the party's Political Bureau invited the Central Committee to elect a secretary general. The victory went to Ahmad al-Asa'ad's son, Firas al-Asa'ad, the secretary of the Political Bureau, who received nearly half of the votes cast. Firas al-Asa'ad remained the secretary general for more than a year without the formal decision of the party leadership giving him the position. During that period, Fadlallah Nasreddin moved to circumvent al-Asa'ad, who succumbed to pressure from inside or outside of the party. The Central Committee protested and decided to elect an interim secretary general for a period of three months. Fadlallah Nasreddin was elected with the support of Firas al-Asa'ad, provided that the new secretary general and the Political Bureau would hold a general conference of the Party. The conference did not happen, and Fadlallah continued as secretary general by acclimation. He currently sits in the People's Council of Syria.

In the 22 April 2007 Syrian parliamentary election, the party was awarded 4 out of 250 seats in the parliament.

References

1974 establishments in Syria
Arab nationalism in Syria
Arab socialist political parties
Political parties established in 1974
Political parties in Syria
Socialist parties in Syria